Dubbo Parish (Gordon County),  is a civil parish of Gordon County, New South Wales. a Cadastral divisions of New South Wales.

The parish, located in Dubbo Regional Council, features the township of West Dubbo, Taronga Western Plains Zoo and Dubbo Observatory. The Burke Railway line passes through the parish. During World War II an airbase was established in the parish.

References

Parishes of Gordon County (New South Wales)